Ramenki is the name of several rural localities in Russia:
Ramenki, Moscow Oblast, a selo in Ramenskoye Rural Settlement of Yegoryevsky District of Moscow Oblast
Ramenki, Ryazan Oblast, a village in Fedyakinsky Rural Okrug of Rybnovsky District of Ryazan Oblast
Ramenki, Tver Oblast, a village in Torzhoksky District of Tver Oblast